Waiting for God may refer to:

Waiting for God (TV series)
Waiting for God (band)
"Waiting for God" (Red Dwarf episode)
"Waiting for God" is a song on the B-side of the Fader (Paradise Lost song) single

See also 
 Waiting for Godot